Yalbuz or Albuz, as an adjective Taz-Dagh (Tas-Tav, Taz-Tağ, Daz-Dağ, Taskıl Dağ or Tazkıl Dağ; means Bald Mountain) is a mysterious and legendary mountain in Turkic mythology.

It is a concept of Turkic, and particularly Altai, folk mythology related to witchcraft. According to legends, ravens, black eagles, witches and other paranormal creatures periodically gather on the "bald mountains". Mentions of Yalbuz can be found in various historical and literary sources, such as in the narratives of Altai. The exact origins and factual evidences of the concept are unclear.

Sources
Türk Söylence Sözlüğü (Turkish Mythological Dictionary), Deniz Karakurt, (OTRS: CC BY-SA 3.0)
Türk Mitolojisi Ansiklopedik Sözlük, Celal Beydili, Yurt Yayınevi

External links
TÜRK MİTOLOJİSİ SÖZLÜĞÜ (T-U); Pınar Karaca - "Taskıl"

Turkic mythology